Mohammad-Reza Rahimi is an Iranian military officer who served as the acting Minister of Defense from 16 August 1984 to 22 October 1985, having previously held office as the deputy to Iran's ministry of defense from January 1983 to August 1984. He was a colonel at the time appointed to the office.

References

Islamic Republic of Iran Army brigadier generals
Defence ministers of Iran
Islamic Republic of Iran Army personnel of the Iran–Iraq War